|}

The Desmond Stakes is a Group 3 flat horse race in Ireland open to thoroughbreds aged three years or older. It is run at Leopardstown over a distance of 1 mile (1,609 metres), and it is scheduled to take place each year in August.

The event is named after Desmond, a champion sire in 1913. It was formerly held at the Curragh, and it used to be known as the Desmond Plate.

The race was transferred to Leopardstown in 2002. It has continued at this venue with one exception, a temporary return to the Curragh in 2009.

Records
Most successful horse since 1946 (2 wins):
 Spring Offensive – 1946, 1947
 White Gloves – 1966, 1967
 Rarity – 1970, 1971

Leading jockey since 1950 (8 wins):
 Christy Roche – Rarity (1971), Mistigri (1975), More So (1978), Anfield (1982), Teleprompter (1984), Totem (1988), Star of Gdansk (1991), Second Empire (1998)

Leading trainer since 1950 (12 wins):
 Vincent O'Brien – Restless Knight (1964), Reindeer (1969), Boucher (1972), Hail the Pirates (1973), Sir Penfro (1974), Niebo (1976), Be My Guest (1977), Belted Earl (1981), Sunstart (1985), Wise Counsellor (1986), Entitled (1987), Via Borghese (1992)

Winners since 1976

Earlier winners

 1946: Spring Offensive
 1947: Spring Offensive
 1948: Straight Flush
 1949: Pink Larkspur
 1950: Galatian
 1951: Fair Contract
 1952: Tipots
 1953: Clonleason
 1954: Zarathustra
 1955: Midontrial
 1956: Jongleur
 1957: Bindy
 1958: Ticklish
 1959: Light Horseman
 1960: Barclay
 1961: Baynard
 1962: Sicilian Prince
 1963: Wily Trout
 1964: Restless Knight
 1965: Khalife
 1966: White Gloves
 1967: White Gloves
 1968: Giolla Mear
 1969: Reindeer
 1970: Rarity
 1971: Rarity
 1972: Boucher
 1973: Hail the Pirates
 1974: Sir Penfro
 1975: Mistigri

See also
 Horse racing in Ireland
 List of Irish flat horse races

References
 Paris-Turf: 
 Racing Post:
 galopp-sieger.de – Desmond Stakes.
 ifhaoneline.org – International Federation of Horseracing Authorities – Desmond Stakes (2019).
 irishracinggreats.com – Desmond Stakes (Group 3).
 pedigreequery.com – Desmond Stakes.

Flat races in Ireland
Open mile category horse races
Leopardstown Racecourse